A magnum cartridge is a firearm cartridge with a larger case size than, or derived from, a similar cartridge of the same projectile (bullet) caliber and case shoulder shape. The term derives from the .357 Magnum, the original cartridge with this designation. For the purpose of this list, magnum cartridges will only be those labeled magnum and will not include cartridges with the power of magnum cartridges like .300PRC nor wildcat cartridges such as .300 lapua magnum

Handgun cartridges
 .224–32 Freedom Arms
 .32 Harrington & Richardson Magnum
 .327 Federal Magnum
 .357/44 Bain & Davis
 .357 Smith & Wesson Magnum
 .357 Remington Maximum
 .357 Super Magnum
 .375 Super Magnum
 .400 Cor-Bon
 .40 Super
 .41 Action Express
 .41 Remington Magnum
 .414 Super Magnum
 .440 Cor-Bon
 .44 Remington Magnum
 .445 Super Magnum
 .45 Super
 .45 Winchester Magnum
 .451 Detonics Magnum
 .454 Casull
 .460 Smith & Wesson Magnum
 .475 Linebaugh
 .475 Wildey Magnum
 .480 Ruger
 .50 Action Express
 .500 Linebaugh
 .500 Maximum
 .500 Smith & Wesson Magnum
 .500 Wyoming Express

Rifle cartridges
 .17 Hornady Magnum Rimfire
 .22 Winchester Magnum Rimfire
.222 Remington Magnum
.223 Winchester Super Short Magnum
.224 Weatherby Magnum
.243 Winchester Super Short Magnum
.240 Weatherby Magnum
.244 Holland & Holland Magnum
.25 Winchester Super Short Magnum
.257 Weatherby Magnum 
.264 Winchester Magnum
6.5-300 Weatherby Magnum 
.270 Winchester Short Magnum 
.270 Weatherby Magnum 
7mm Remington Short Action Ultra Magnum 
7mm Winchester Short Magnum 
.275 Holland & Holland Magnum
7mm Remington Magnum  
7mm Remington Ultra Magnum  
7mm Mashburn Super Magnum
7mm Weatherby Magnum  
.300 Ruger Compact Magnum  
.300 Remington Short Action Ultra Magnum  
.300 Winchester Short Magnum  
.300 Winchester Magnum  
.300 Holland & Holland Magnum  
.308 Norma Magnum  
.300 Norma Magnum  
.300 Weatherby Magnum  
.300 Remington Ultra Magnum
.30-378 Weatherby Magnum
.325 Winchester Short Magnum
8mm Remington Magnum 
.338 Ruger Compact Magnum
.338 Winchester Magnum 
.338 Remington Ultra Magnum
.338 Norma Magnum
.338 Lapua Magnum
.340 Weatherby Magnum
.338-378 Weatherby Magnum 
.358 Norma Magnum
.375 Holland & Holland Magnum
.375 Weatherby Magnum 
.375 Remington Ultra Magnum
.378 Weatherby Magnum 
10.3x68 magnum
.400 Holland & Holland Magnum
.416 Remington Magnum 
.458 Winchester Magnum
.460 Weatherby Magnum

See also 
 Fully powered cartridge
 Intermediate cartridge
 PDW cartridge

Pistol and rifle cartridges